Vallivue High School is a four-year public secondary school in Caldwell, Idaho, United States, and one of two traditional high schools in the Vallivue School District. Opened  in 1963, the school's campus is between Caldwell and Lake Lowell on the corner of Montana and Homedale roads. The current principal is Shane Carson. The school colors are brown and gold to represent the school's rich agricultural tradition, and its mascot is a falcon.

Athletics
Vallivue competes in athletics in IHSAA Class 4A with the second largest schools in the state. It is a member in the Southern Idaho Conference (4A) (SIC), whose other nine members are in adjacent Ada County. VHS's main rival is the cross-district Ridgevue High School, now in Class 4A. In earlier years, Caldwell had the larger enrollment and competed in A-1 (now 5A), and Vallivue was in A-2.

State titles
Boys
 Football (2): fall (A-2) 1979; (A-1 Div II, now 4A) 1999 (official with introduction of playoffs, A-2 in 1978)
 Cross country (4): fall (B) 1992, (A-2) 1996, 1997; (A-1, Div II) 2000 (introduced in 1964)
 Basketball (3): (A-2) 1976; (A-1, Div II) 2001; (5A) 2008
 Baseball (6): (A-2) 1985, 1986, 1987, 1988, 1989; (A-1, Div II) 2001 (records not kept by IHSAA, state tourney introduced in 1971, A-2 in 1980)
 Track (1): (A-1 Div II) 2001
 Golf (2): (A-1 Div II) 2001, (4A) 2002
Soccer (1): (4A) 2020

Girls
 Cross country (1): fall (A-1, Div II) 2000 (introduced in 1974)
 Basketball (1): (4A) 2006 (introduced in 1976)

Combined
 Tennis (2): (4A) 2002, 2003 (combined until 2008)
Marching Band (7) 2009,2010,2011,2012,2013,2014,2015

Notable alumni
Daniel T. Eismann, justice, Idaho Supreme Court; former chief justice (2007–11)

Lou Roberts 1971

References

External links
 
 Vallivue School District #139

Public high schools in Idaho
Treasure Valley
Schools in Canyon County, Idaho
Caldwell, Idaho
1963 establishments in Idaho